Andy Ling is a British trance artist and remixer. He became popular due to his "Fixation" single. This reached No. 55 in the UK Singles Chart in 2000, and was released on the Hooj Choons label.

Discography

Singles
1996 "Calling Angels"
1998 "Anuna"
1999 "Fixation"
2001 "Futura"

References

External links

Year of birth missing (living people)
Living people
British record producers
British trance musicians